("Clodian laws") were a series of laws (plebiscites) passed by the Plebeian Council of the Roman Republic under the tribune Publius Clodius Pulcher in 58 BC. Clodius was a member of the patrician family ("gens") Claudius; the alternative spelling of his name is sometimes regarded as a political gesture. With the support of Julius Caesar, who held his first consulship in 59 BC, Clodius had himself adopted into a plebeian family in order to qualify for the office of tribune of the plebs, which was not open to patricians. Clodius was famously a bitter opponent of Cicero.

The Laws 
One law, the Lex Clodia de Auspiciis ("The Law of Clodius on the Auspices"), prevented the Roman Magistrates, who presided over the legislative assemblies, from dissolving the assemblies (specifically, the Tribal Assembly), by declaring that unfavourable omens (auspices) had been observed. This had been an ordinary form of legislative obstruction for centuries, and was formally codified around the year 150 BC by the Lex Aelia et Fufia. Pompey, for example, was known to have used this obstructive device at least once. Thus, in effect, this law repealed the Lex Aelia et Fufia.

Another law, the Lex Clodia de Censoribus ("The Law of Clodius on the Censors"), prescribed certain rules for the Roman Censors in exercising their functions as inspectors of public morals (mores). It also required the concurrence of both Censors to inflict the nota censoria. During the census (conducted once every five years), the Censors could place a nota next to the name of a citizen, usually for offences such as bankruptcy, cowardice, or having been a gladiator. If a citizen had a nota placed besides his name, he was subject to a range of penalties, including fines, exile, assignment to an inferior tribe for voting purposes, or even the loss of his citizenship. Thus, by requiring concurrence for the placement of a nota, this law placed an additional check on the powers of the Censors. This was typically the only act that required the concurrence of both Censors. Also, when a senator had been already convicted before an ordinary court, this law permitted the Censors to remove him from the senate in a summary way. This law was repealed in 52 BC by the Lex Caecilia de censoria, which was enacted by a political enemy of Clodius, Metellus Scipio.

A third law, the Lex Clodia de Civibus Romanis Interemptis, was key to Caesar's support for Clodius. The law threatened punishment for anyone who offered fire and water to those who had executed Roman citizens without a trial "qui civem Romanum indemnatum interemisset, ei aqua et igni interdiceretur." This was an ingenious means of forcing Cicero into exile without trying him directly. Cicero, an enemy of Clodius having executed members of the Catilinarian conspiracy several years before without formal trial, was clearly the intended target of the law. Caesar supported Clodius as he wanted Cicero exiled (Cicero was one of the leaders of the Senate's optimates, which was a group that opposed Caesar, Clodius, and other populares.)  As a result of this law, Cicero went into exile, from which he did not return for 18 months.

A fourth law, the Lex Clodia Frumentaria required the distribution of grain to Rome's poor citizens for free. Before this law, grain had been distributed to Rome's poor at a low price instead. This was somewhat radical, as during the first centuries of the republic, as per the Valerian and Porcian laws, several citizens had been executed for distributing free grain to the poor, under the concern that they were plotting to win popular support in order to overthrow the government and seize a tyranny.

A fifth law, the Lex Clodia de Sodalitatibus ("The Law of Clodius on the Associations") was a law that declared that certain clubs of a "semi-political nature" (i.e. armed gangs) were lawful. These clubs had been abolished through a decree of the senate in 80 BC, probably upon the urging of the aristocratic Roman Dictator Lucius Cornelius Sulla, who had attempted to weaken the power of Rome's citizens and to strengthen the senate. The result of this law was a wave of violence and gang warfare that resulted in Clodius' murder, and that was not to end until the end of the republic and the establishment of the Roman Empire.

A sixth law, the Lex Clodia de Libertinorum Suffragiis ("The Law of Clodius on the Voting of Freedmen") attempted to extend freedmen's (i.e. ex-slaves') voting rights (suffrage).

A seventh law, the Lex Clodia de Rege Ptolemaeo et de exsulibus Byzantinis pertained to several of Rome's eastern provinces and vassal states (in particular Ptolemaic Egypt and Byzantium in Greece).

See also

Roman Law
List of Roman laws

References

External links
The Roman Law Library, incl. Leges
Entry from Harry Thurston Peck, "Harpers Dictionary of Classical Antiquities" (from the Perseus Project)

Modern works 

 Tatum, W. Jeffrey. The Patrician Tribune: P. Clodius Pulcher. Studies in the History of Greece and Rome (University of North Carolina Press, 1999) hardcover 
 Fezzi, L: Il tribuno Clodio (Roma-Bari, Laterza, 2008) 

58 BC
1st century BC in law
Roman law
1st century BC in the Roman Republic